František Schmucker (28 January 1940 in Horvátjárfalu, Hungary – 15 July 2004 in Ostrava) was a Czech football player.

During his club career he played for FC Baník Ostrava and RH Brno. He earned 2 caps for the Czechoslovakia national football team, and was part of the second-placed team at the 1962 FIFA World Cup, and also won a silver medal in Football at the 1964 Summer Olympics.

References

External links
 

1940 births
2004 deaths
Czech footballers
Czechoslovak footballers
Czechoslovakia international footballers
Olympic footballers of Czechoslovakia
Olympic silver medalists for Czechoslovakia
Olympic medalists in football
Footballers at the 1964 Summer Olympics
Medalists at the 1964 Summer Olympics
Footballers from Bratislava
Association football goalkeepers
1962 FIFA World Cup players
FC Baník Ostrava players
FC Zbrojovka Brno players